The Mangorewa River is a river of the Bay of Plenty Region of New Zealand's North Island. It flows northeast from its sources on the Mamaku Plateau northwest of Lake Rotorua, reaching the Kaituna River close to the town of Paengaroa.

See also
List of rivers of New Zealand

References

Rivers of the Bay of Plenty Region
Rivers of New Zealand